An admiral of the fleet or shortened to fleet admiral is a senior naval flag officer rank, usually equivalent to Field marshal and Marshal of the air force. An admiral of the fleet is typically senior to an admiral.

It is also a generic term for a senior admiral in command of a large group of ships, comprising a fleet or, in some cases, a group of fleets. If actually a rank, its name can vary depending on the country. In addition to "fleet admiral" and "admiral of the fleet", such rank names include "admiral of the navy" and "grand admiral".

Etymology
The title admiral of the fleet can trace its origins to the Middle Ages, where the title was typically granted to a nobleman who was appointed by a monarch to raise and command a navy for a specific campaign.

Usage in specific countries 
The following articles contain specific information on the rank as it pertains to individual countries:
 Admiral of the fleet (Australia)
 Admiral flote (Croatia)
 Admiral of the fleet (Russia)
 Admiral of the fleet (Soviet Union)
 Admiral of the fleet (Sri Lanka)
 Chom phon ruea (Thailand)
 Admiral flote (Socialist Federal Republic of Yugoslavia)
 Admiral of the fleet (United Kingdom)
 Fleet admiral (United States)
 Admiral of the Navy (United States) (1903-1917)

Ambiguity exists when translating the French amiral into English (into admiral of the fleet or admiral). A French title of amiral de la flotte, outranking a full admiral was created in 1939 for Darlan, who was the only person in French history to hold that title. Amiral de la flotte became a rank in 1942, when Darlan was commander in chief of the military forces of the Vichy Regime. The rank of Amiral de la flotte was still mentioned in French laws in 1957.

NATO code
While the rank of admiral of the fleet/fleet admiral is used in most of NATO countries, it is ranked differently depending on the country.

Gallery

See also 
 List of fleet and grand admirals
 Admiralissimo

References 

 Francis E. McMurtrie and Raymond V.B. Blackman (editors), Jane's Fighting Ships 1949-50. New York: The McGraw-Hill Book Company, Inc., 1949.

Naval ranks
Five-star officers